Simon Madden (born 30 December 1957) is a former Australian rules footballer who played his entire 19-season career with the Essendon Football Club from 1974 until 1992. Madden is one of the most decorated players in the club's history and widely regarded as one of the finest ruckmen to ever play the game.

Early life 
Madden was born in Melbourne; he attended primary school at St Christopher's in Airport West and had his secondary schooling at St. Bernard's College in Essendon, a school renowned for its sporting prowess. He then studied teaching at the Institute of Catholic Education (now the Australian Catholic University).

AFL career 
In all, he played 378 senior matches, the second-most by any Essendon player (behind Dustin Fletcher), and sixth-most in league history (behind Michael Tuck, Kevin Bartlett, Brent Harvey, Robert Harvey, and Dustin Fletcher). In addition to playing in the ruck, Madden was a handy part-time forward, kicking 575 goals in his career, a club record that stood until it was broken in 2003 by full-forward Matthew Lloyd.

Madden won four Essendon best and fairest awards (1977, 1979, 1983 and 1984) and captained the side in the 1980 and 1981 seasons. He played in the back-to-back premiership sides in 1984 and 1985, winning the Norm Smith Medal for best on ground in the 1985 Grand Final. In 1986, Madden rejected an unheard-of offer for a 3-year contract totalling $550,000 (~$1.54 million in 2021 terms) by the eccentric Geoffrey Edelsten on behalf of the Sydney Swans, instead choosing to remain with Essendon for his entire career. Regarding the offer, Madden replied, "You can take the boy out of Essendon, but you can't take Essendon out of the boy." However, Madden estimated that, in 2009 dollars (when he was interviewed) and taking into account the cost of buying a house, etc., it was actually the equivalent of $4.4 million over three years. However, Madden claimed that he never regretted the decision.

He was named in the All-Australian Team on three occasions (1983, 1987 and 1988). Madden captained the Victorian interstate team in 1989–91, and in 1990 received the Simpson Medal for best on ground in the Victoria vs. Western Australia match played in Perth.

He was named in the ruck in Essendon's Team of the Century and named as the fifth-best player ever to play for the club in the "Champions of Essendon" list.

After his playing days were over, Madden had a brief stint as ruck coach for Carlton. He was with the Blues for the 1993 season, in which they made the grand final but lost to Madden's former club, Essendon.

He was president of the AFL Players' Association from 1985 until 1989.

His brother Justin was also a top-class ruckman for Essendon and Carlton, and they are the only set of brothers to each play 300 games at VFL/AFL level. Both brothers had their secondary schooling at St Bernard's College, Melbourne, a school renowned for its sporting prowess. The school is the only one to ever produce three 300-game players, with Simon and Justin Madden joining former Bomber Garry Foulds in this achievement.

Statistics

|- style="background-color: #EAEAEA"
! scope="row" style="text-align:center" | 1974
|
| 27 || 6 || 18 || 8 || 52 || 8 || 60 || 28 ||  || 0 || 3.0 || 1.3 || 8.7 || 1.3 || 10.0 || 4.7 ||  || 0.0 || 2
|-
! scope="row" style="text-align:center" | 1975
|
| 27 || 19 || 37 || 29 || 138 || 19 || 157 || 59 ||  || 29 || 1.9 || 1.6 || 7.7 || 1.1 || 8.7 || 3.3 ||  || 4.8 || 0
|- style="background-color: #EAEAEA"
! scope="row" style="text-align:center" | 1976
|
| 27 || 20 || 28 || 18 || 123 || 43 || 166 || 78 ||  || 86 || 1.4 || 0.9 || 6.2 || 2.2 || 8.3 || 3.9 ||  || 4.5 || 3
|-
! scope="row" style="text-align:center" | 1977
|
| 27 || 20 || 33 || 11 || 234 || 81 || 315 || 126 ||  || 378 || 1.7 || 0.6 || 11.7 || 4.1 || 15.8 || 6.3 ||  || 19.9 || 25
|- style="background-color: #EAEAEA"
! scope="row" style="text-align:center" | 1978
|
| 27 || 22 || 40 || 25 || 199 || 72 || 271 || 138 ||  || 301 || 1.8 || 1.1 || 9.0 || 3.3 || 12.3 || 6.3 ||  || 14.3 || 7
|-
! scope="row" style="text-align:center" | 1979
|
| 27 || 23 || 39 || 31 || 220 || 106 || 326 || 158 ||  || 263 || 1.7 || 1.3 || 9.6 || 4.6 || 14.2 || 6.9 ||  || 11.4 || 3
|- style="background-color: #EAEAEA"
! scope="row" style="text-align:center" | 1980
|
| 27 || 21 || 45 || 27 || 176 || 95 || 271 || 111 ||  || 211 || 2.1 || 1.3 || 8.4 || 4.5 || 12.9 || 5.3 ||  || 10.0 || 5
|-
! scope="row" style="text-align:center" | 1981
|
| 27 || 19 || 36 || 34 || 135 || 69 || 204 || 89 ||  || 236 || 1.9 || 1.8 || 7.1 || 3.6 || 10.7 || 4.7 ||  || 12.4 || 7
|- style="background-color: #EAEAEA"
! scope="row" style="text-align:center" | 1982
|
| 27 || 21 || 49 || 25 || 142 || 74 || 216 || 92 ||  || 230 || 2.3 || 1.2 || 6.8 || 3.5 || 10.3 || 4.4 ||  || 11.0 || 7
|-
! scope="row" style="text-align:center" | 1983
|
| 27 || 26 || 26 || 16 || 235 || 156 || 391 || 179 ||  || bgcolor="b7e718"| 812 || 1.0 || 0.6 || 9.0 || 6.0 || 15.0 || 6.9 ||  || 31.2 || 22
|- style="background-color: #EAEAEA"
| scope=row bgcolor=F0E68C | 1984# ||  || 27
| 24 || 27 || 17 || 177 || 137 || 314 || 151 ||  || 699 || 1.1 || 0.7 || 7.4 || 5.7 || 13.1 || 6.3 ||  || 29.1 || 14
|-
| scope=row bgcolor=F0E68C | 1985# ||  || 27
| 20 || 19 || 21 || 163 || 123 || 286 || 136 ||  || 322 || 1.0 || 1.1 || 8.2 || 6.2 || 14.3 || 6.8 ||  || 16.1 || 11
|- style="background-color: #EAEAEA"
! scope="row" style="text-align:center" | 1986
|
| 27 || 23 || 25 || 11 || 182 || 112 || 294 || 114 ||  || 338 || 1.1 || 0.5 || 7.9 || 4.9 || 12.8 || 5.0 ||  || 14.7 || 4
|-
! scope="row" style="text-align:center" | 1987
|
| 27 || 14 || 9 || 4 || 85 || 65 || 150 || 69 || 12 || 252 || 0.6 || 0.3 || 6.1 || 4.6 || 10.7 || 4.9 || 0.9 || 18.0 || 1
|- style="background-color: #EAEAEA"
! scope="row" style="text-align:center" | 1988
|
| 27 || 22 || 31 || 8 || 183 || 95 || 278 || 138 || 27 || 257 || 1.4 || 0.4 || 8.3 || 4.3 || 12.6 || 6.3 || 1.2 || 11.7 || 16
|-
! scope="row" style="text-align:center" | 1989
|
| 27 || 25 || 33 || 16 || 239 || 81 || 320 || 138 || 28 || 350 || 1.3 || 0.6 || 9.6 || 3.2 || 12.8 || 5.5 || 1.1 || 14.0 || 3
|- style="background-color: #EAEAEA"
! scope="row" style="text-align:center" | 1990
|
| 27 || 23 || 30 || 16 || 195 || 6 || 2616 || 116 || 22 || 225 || 1.3 || 0.7 || 8.5 || 2.9 || 11.3 || 5.0 || 1.0 || 9.8 || 4
|-
! scope="row" style="text-align:center" | 1991
|
| 27 || 23 || 42 || 15 || 203 || 71 || 274 || 122 || 14 || 209 || 1.8 || 0.7 || 8.8 || 3.1 || 11.9 || 5.3 || 0.6 || 9.1 || 5
|- style="background-color: #EAEAEA"
! scope="row" style="text-align:center" | 1992
|
| 27 || 7 || 8 || 2 || 39 || 18 || 57 || 21 || 3 || 28 || 1.1 || 0.3 || 5.6 || 2.6 || 8.1 || 3.0 || 0.4 || 4.0 || 0
|- class="sortbottom"
! colspan=3| Career
! 378
! 575
! 334
! 3120
! 1491
! 4611
! 2063
! 106
! 5226
! 1.5
! 0.9
! 8.3
! 3.9
! 12.2
! 5.5
! 0.9
! 14.7
! 139
|}

Honours and achievements
Team
 2× VFL premiership player: 1984, 1985
 4× McClelland Trophy: 1984, 1985, 1989, 1990

Individual
 Norm Smith Medal: 1985
 3× All-Australian team: 1983, 1987, 1988
 6× VFL Team of the Year: 1983, 1984, 1987, 1988, 1989, 1990
 4× Crichton Medal: 1977, 1979, 1983, 1984
 3× Essendon leading goalkicker: 1980, 1982, 1991
 Essendon captain: 1980–1981
 Essendon Team of the Century 1897-1996
Australian Football Hall of Fame: 1996 Inductee
 Simpson Medal: 1990
 E. J. Whitten Medal: 1990
 5× State of Origin (Victoria): 1983, 1984, 1989 (c), 1990 (c), 1991 (c)

Life After AFL 
Madden has an extended background in education and worked as a teacher for 15 years, attaining the position of Vice Principal.

Madden was President of the AFL Players' Association from 1985 to 1989.

Madden became head coach of St. Bernards Old Collegians Football Club in 2005.

He now spends a considerable amount of time in the classic rock band Better Late Than Never playing at local pubs and clubs with a group of long-term friends.

References

External links

Profile on essendonfc.com.au

Australian Football Hall of Fame inductees
All-Australians (1953–1988)
Essendon Football Club players
Essendon Football Club Premiership players
Champions of Essendon
Victorian State of Origin players
1957 births
Living people
Norm Smith Medal winners
Crichton Medal winners
Australian rules footballers from Melbourne
People educated at St. Bernard's College, Melbourne
E. J. Whitten Medal winners
Australia international rules football team players
Two-time VFL/AFL Premiership players